William Street Hutchings, (January 7, 1832 - August 25, 1911) also known as Professor Hutchings and the Lightning Calculator, was a 19th-century math prodigy and mental calculator who P. T. Barnum first billed as the "Boy Lightning Calculator".  He later worked as a sideshow barker and wrote a book called The Lightning Calculator.

Early years
William Street Hutchings was born on January 7, 1832, to John Hutchings, a merchant from Long Island, New York and his wife Jane Street. He was born in Manhattan near the corner of Hester Street and Eldridge Street. He attended Hubbs and Clark Academy, and showed skill in mathematics. He worked for a number of years as an accountant for his father.

Career
By 1860, Hutchings was working at Barnum's American Museum. He worked there until it burned down the second time in 1868. In 1872, he performed at the White House for President Ulysses S. Grant. In 1883, he began performing at Austin and Stone's Dime Museum. He continued to perform there until the time of his death. He claimed to have given 30,000 lectures to 80,000,000 people during the course of his career. He was buried in Mount Hope Cemetery in Boston, Massachusetts.

References

External links
 
 The Lightning Calculator by Professor Hutchings (1867)
 T. Allston Brown's History of the American Stage Biographical Sketches 1733 - 1870 (circus related)
 Obituary
 

American entertainers
Sideshow performers
Ringling Bros. and Barnum & Bailey Circus
1832 births
1911 deaths